The 1896 Wyoming Cowboys football team represented the University of Wyoming as an independent during the 1896 college football season.

For the third consecutive year, Herbert J. Brees was the team captain. Brees was a native of Laramie, Wyoming who went on to a career in the United States Army. He retired from the Army in 1941 with the rank of lieutenant general. In the program's first three years under coach Soule and captain Brees (1894–1896), the team compiled a 6–0 record and outscored opponents by a total of 128 to 26.

Schedule

References

Wyoming
Wyoming Cowboys football seasons
College football undefeated seasons
Wyoming Cowboys football